Adelaide-Blanche of Anjou( –1026) was, by her successive marriages, countess of Gévaudan and Forez, of Toulouse, of Provence, and of Burgundy, and queen of Aquitaine. She was the regent of Gevaudan during the minority of her sons in the 960s, and the regent of Provence during the minority of her son from 994 until 999.

Life
She was the daughter of Count Fulk II of Anjou and Gerberga, and sister of Geoffrey Greymantle. She successfully increased Angevin fortunes, being married a total of five times. Her family had become upwardly mobile to the point that, as a member of just the third generation from Ingelger, Adelaide-Blanche had married into the highest ranks of the older nobility of western Francia.

Her first marriage was to Stephen, the powerful count of Gévaudan and Forez in eastern Aquitaine. She was no more than fifteen at the time and he was much older. Still, they had three children who survived to adulthood. Stephen died in the early 960s and after his death she ruled the lands as regent for her sons William, Pons and Bertrand. She continued to govern Gevaudan and Forez while her remaining two sons learned to rule their father's counties. Additionally, after her oldest son William's death in 975 she raised his infant son Stephen. Her brother Guy was made count-bishop of Le Puy in 975 amidst local opposition and at his request Adelaide, acting for her sons Guy and Bertrand, led an army to aid him in establishing the "Peace of God" in le Puy.

In 982, as the widow of her second husband, Count Raymond III of Toulouse, she wed Louis, son of King Lothair of France. The two were crowned king and queen of Aquitaine at Brioude by her brother Guy. The marriage lasted just over a year due to the couple being unable to peacefully live together. There was also a significant age difference—he being fifteen and Adelaide-Blanche being over forty. Adelaide found herself in a precarious situation with King Lothair, but was rescued by Count William I of Provence,, whom she subsequently married . Count William died in 994 shortly after becoming a monk at Avignon.

In 1010 King Robert II of France, along with Count Odo II of Blois, went to Rome to secure an annulment from Robert's second wife, Constance of Arles, Adelaide-Blanche's daughter by William I. Pope Sergius IV, a friend to the Angevin counts, upheld the marriage and additionally upheld Adelaide's struggle to maintain control of lands at Montmajour Abbey. These lands at Perth had been donated by Count William I of Provence with his wife Adelaide-Blanche, as well as by a previous donation by William's father, Boson. A dispute over these lands arose by four brothers, sons of Nevolongus, who pope Sergius threatened with excommunication if they did not withdraw their claim. The claim was withdrawn and the lands remained under the control of Adelaide-Blanche acting as regent for her son William II of Provence.

It has been suggested that she married a fifth time, to Count Otto-William of Burgundy, whose second wife was named Adelaide. However, it is disputed whether his wife Adelaide was the same as Adelaide-Blanche.

Adelaide-Blanche died in 1026, aged approximately eighty-six. The location of her death was probably at Avignon, since the year of her death is recorded by Arnoux, a monk of the abbey of Saint-André, near Avignon. She was buried in Montmajour Abbey, near Arles, considered at the time as the burial place of the family of counts of Provence.

Marriages and children
Adelaide-Blanche married first, Stephen, Viscount of Gévaudan (d. 970). Children of this marriage were:
 William, (–975).
 Pons, Count of Gévaudan and Forez. He died aft. 26 February 1011.
 Bertrand, Count of Gévaudan.
 Almodis of Gévaudan, she married Adalbert I de Charroux, Count de la Haute March.
 Philippa of Gévaudan, (married William d 'Auvergne, possibly named Bertha) 

Adelaide-Blanche's second marriage was to Raymond III, Count of Toulouse and Prince of Gothia, in 975. He died in 978. She had by him at least one child:
 William III, Count of Toulouse
 Constance of Provence

Adelaide-Blanche married, as her third husband, Louis V of France. The two were crowned King and Queen of Aquitaine, but the marriage ended in annulment.

Adelaide-Blanche's fourth husband, William I of Provence . Together they had:
 William II of Provence
 Constance of Arles, who later married Robert II of France.
 Ermengarde, she married Robert I, Count of Auvergne.
 Tota-Adelaide, she married Bernard I, Count of Besalú.

Notes

References

Sources

External links
Medieval Lands Project on Adelaide of Anjou
 Baldwin, Stewart, FASG, Adélaïde/Alix alias Blanche of Anjou , Henry Project

940s births
1026 deaths
Year of birth uncertain
House of Ingelger
Aquitainian queens consort
Countesses of Burgundy
Countesses of Toulouse
Countesses of Provence
Remarried royal consorts
10th-century women rulers
11th-century women rulers
10th-century French people
10th-century French women
11th-century French people
11th-century French women